Soomra may refer to:

 Soomra, Estonia, village in Audru Parish, Pärnu County, in southwestern Estonia
 Soomra (tribe) or Soomro, a Sindhi tribe in Sindh, parts of Punjab, and Balochistan
 Soomra Dynasty, a dynasty established by the Soomra tribe in 1024-1351